Bad Pumpkin is the second album by alternative rock band Fetchin Bones, released in 1986 through Capitol Records.

Track listing 
All songs written by Fetchin Bones

Personnel 

Fetchin Bones
 Gary White – Lead Guitar, Bass, Vocals
 Aaron Pitkin – Guitars, Backing Vocals
 Marc Mueller - Drums, Percussion
 Danna Pentes – Bass, Violin, Backing Vocals
 Hope Nicholls – Vocals, Harmonica, Percussion

Additional musicians and production
 Don Dixon – production

References 

1986 albums
Albums produced by Don Dixon (musician)
Capitol Records albums
Fetchin Bones albums